Daniel 'Dani' Hernández Santos (born 21 October 1985) is a Venezuelan professional footballer who plays for Spanish club CF Fuenlabrada as a goalkeeper.

Club career

Early career
Born in Caracas, Hernández played Spanish lower league and amateur football until the age of 25, competing mainly in the Community of Madrid. During that time, he represented CF Rayo Majadahonda, CD Guadalajara, CU Collado Villalba, Real Madrid C, Rayo Vallecano B, Real Jaén, Valencia CF Mestalla and Real Murcia, delivering a Player of the match performance on 26 October 2010 in a 0–0 home draw against Real Madrid in the round of 32 of Copa del Rey (5–1 aggregate loss). Additionally, he represented SD Huesca in the Segunda División in the first part of the 2009–10 campaign, but his input consisted of two domestic cup appearances.

Valladolid
On 19 August 2011, Hernández signed a 1+2 contract with Real Valladolid in division two. He spent the vast majority of his first year as understudy to Jaime but, due to injury to his teammate, excelled in the promotion playoffs as the team returned to La Liga after a two-year absence, conceding only once in four appearances and three starts.

Hernández continued to be first choice in the 2012–13 season, helping the Castile and León side retain their league status after ranking in 14th position. After a one-year loan in the Super League Greece with Asteras Tripolis FC, he acted as backup to Javi Varas.

Tenerife
On 15 January 2015, free agent Hernández joined second-tier CD Tenerife on a short-term deal. In May 2018, he became the club's third goalkeeper with the most matches in Spanish competitions, at 138.

Hernández subsequently played second-fiddle to Juan Soriano.

Fuenlabrada
On 14 July 2022, the 36-year-old Hernández signed a two-year contract with CF Fuenlabrada, recently relegated to the Primera Federación.

International career
Hernández made his debut for Venezuela on 7 September 2010, in a 1–0 friendly win with Ecuador. As a backup, he was part of the squad that appeared at the 2011 Copa América in Argentina.

Personal life
Hernández's older brother, Jonay, is a former footballer. A defender, he too spent most of his professional career in Spain, also appearing for the Venezuela national team.

Career statistics

Club

International

References

External links

1985 births
Living people
Venezuelan people of Spanish descent
Venezuelan footballers
Spanish footballers
Footballers from Caracas
Association football goalkeepers
La Liga players
Segunda División players
Segunda División B players
Tercera División players
Primera Federación players
CF Rayo Majadahonda players
CD Guadalajara (Spain) footballers
CU Collado Villalba players
Real Madrid C footballers
Rayo Vallecano B players
Rayo Vallecano players
Real Jaén footballers
SD Huesca footballers
Valencia CF Mestalla footballers
Real Murcia players
Real Valladolid players
CD Tenerife players
CF Fuenlabrada footballers
Super League Greece players
Asteras Tripolis F.C. players
Venezuela international footballers
2011 Copa América players
2015 Copa América players
Copa América Centenario players
Venezuelan expatriate footballers
Expatriate footballers in Spain
Expatriate footballers in Greece
Venezuelan expatriate sportspeople in Spain
Venezuelan expatriate sportspeople in Greece